Alophe metios was an early cercopithecoid monkey that lived in Kenya about 22 million years ago.  It is known from jaw fragments and teeth.  Although it was more closely related to modern cercopithecids (Old World monkeys) than to apes, it had not evolved some features shared by crown cercopithecids and their nearest relatives, such as bilophodont molars.

The monkey was originally named Alophia metios, but the genus Alophia was already taken by a moth, prompting the new name Alophe.

References

External links
 Rasmussen's posthumous publication solves ancient monkey mystery

Old World monkeys
Fossil taxa described in 2019